Hernando State Bank was a bank based in Brooksville, Florida. The bank was located in a historic building. In 1985, the bank was acquired by Suntrust Banks. At that time, the bank had 8 branches.

History
The bank was established in 1905 with $15,000 in capital by a group of people including J.C. Burwell, Merchant J. A. Jennings, Sheriff W. E. Law, Turpentine Operators L.B. Varn, G. W. Varn, and G. C. Varn, Aripeka Saw Mill president M. A. Amorous.

The bank headquarters was built that same year. The first president of the bank was James A. Jennings.

In 1907, William McKethan acquired the bank and became its president. His son, Alfred A. McKethan, later took over as president.

In 1985, the bank was acquired by Sun Bank, later Suntrust Banks.

References

Bank buildings in Florida
Buildings and structures in Hernando County, Florida
Commercial buildings completed in 1905
1905 establishments in Florida
Brooksville, Florida
Banks established in 1905
Defunct banks of the United States